Bunn Hackney was a college basketball and football player for the North Carolina Tar Heels. He was an All-Southern running guard on the basketball team, with Jack Cobb. He had previously played for Merrill Patton "Footsie" Knight at the YMCA in Durham. The origin story for the Rameses mascot is his rubbing a ram's head prior to making a 30-yard drop kick to defeat VMI 3-0 in 1924. He was later a referee in both sports; a head linesman in football.

References 

North Carolina Tar Heels men's basketball players
North Carolina Tar Heels football players
Guards (basketball)
American football officials
Basketball referees